Certified Payment-Card Industry Security Manager (CPISM) is an independent payments industry certification governed by the Society of Payment Security Professionals (commonly known as the SPSP).  The CPISM is the de facto certification for payment security professionals.  This certification is held by members from diverse backgrounds including Level 1 - 4 Merchants, Acquirers, Issuers, QSAs, Processors, Gateways, Service Providers, and Consultants.  All CPISM holders are members of the SPSP.

'Society of Payment Security Professionals' Website Defunct.  
The sites for www.paymentsecuritypros.com as well as the associated www.pcianswers.com are defunct.

Certification Knowledge Domains 
The CPISM curriculum covers subject matter in a variety of Information Security and Payments Industry topics. The CPISM examination is based on what a collection of topics relevant to payment industry security professionals.  The CPISM Knowledge Domains establishes a common framework of payment industry terms and definitions that allow security professionals to discuss and debate matters pertaining to the profession with a common understanding.

The CPISM Knowledge Domains are:

 Payment card industry structure
 Payment card structure and data
 Payment card transaction processing
 Compromise fraud statistics and trends
 Merchant risk analysis
 Laws and the regulatory environment
 Payment card security programs
 Third party relationships

Requirements 
Candidates for the CPISM must meet several requirements:
 First, join the Payment Card Security Community
 Second, provide a resume with current credentials and two letters of reference from industry professionals
 Third, one must pass the CPISM exam
 Upon completion of the exam with a passing grade, the SPSP will issue the CPISM Certificate

Reference Documents 
The SPSP provides several reference documents for studying and preparing for the CPISM certification:
 CPISM Overview Document
 CPISM Bibliography
 CPISM Study Guide

See also 
 Certified Payment-Card Industry Security Auditor (CPISA)
 PCI DSS
 Payment Card Industry

External links
PCI DSS Standard  
Payment Card Industry Fact Sheets

References

Payment cards